Morona Santiago is a province in Ecuador. The province was established on February 24, 1954. The capital is Macas.

Economy 
The provincial economy is industrially unexploited to its potential due to poor means of transportation. Its economy relies largely on the tourist sector of the rain forest. The Sangay National Park and the indigenous town of Shuara are some of its main attractions.

Cantons 
The province is divided into 12 cantons. The following table lists each with its population at the 2001 census, its area in square kilometres (km²), and the name of the canton seat or capital.

See also 
 Provinces of Ecuador
 Cantons of Ecuador

References

External links 

  Gobierno Provincial de Morona Santiago, official website
  Gobierno Provincial de Morona Santiago, official website
  Actividades de La Capital de  Morona Santiago,
 Logroño Turismo

 
Provinces of Ecuador
States and territories established in 1954
1954 establishments in Ecuador